Eddie Astanin (born December 16, 1961; Moscow) is a Russian economist, the Chairman of the Executive Board of National Settlement Depository, Russia's central securities depository.

He is the first representative of Russia on the board of directors of SWIFT.

References 

Economists from Moscow
1961 births
Living people